Zahra Khatamirad (is an Iranian TV presenter and journalism born on December 17, 1981, in Aachen, Germany.

Biography 
Zahra Khatamirad was born into an Iranian family in Aachen, Germany. She started her activity in Iran TV in 2004.  She also holds a degree in Agricultural engineering from the University of Tehran and a bachelor's degree in German literature from Shahid Beheshti University. She also has two sons, Mani and Nami.

TV activity 
She is an official reporter and TV Host of the IRIB with over 15 years of experience in performance, journalism, design of television programs, narration, radio anchor and interior design of TV program decor. Also she has worked as a presenter in various Iranian television programs such as: Host Simaye Khanevadeh (2015-2016), Host Shahr Avard (2013), Host Khaneh Mehr (2020), Reporter, journalist and TV host at the national Iranian television broadcasting (2009-2017), special reporter of the live broadcast of Iran's presidential election (2013-2017), reporting and journalism in cinema and TV projects in Tehran, TV host and writer of women social program Dokhtaraneh (2006-2008).

Resignation 

After 15 years of activity in Iran TV, she announced her resignation from Iran TV in 2019 due to the Ukrainian plane crash and the events of November 2019 in Iran through her official Instagram page. The publication of this news became so hot that it attracted the attention of Persian language news networks such as VOA, BBC and received a lot of coverage.

References

External links 
 
 Zahra Khatamirad on Instagram

Iranian television presenters
Iranian women television presenters
1981 births
Living people
People from Aachen